Jean Bassoul, BS, also John Bassoul, (7 May 1920 in Maghdouché, Lebanon – 9 August 1977) was an archbishop of the Melkite Greek Catholic Archeparchy of Zahle and Forzol.

Ordination

On 11 July 1943 Bassoul was ordained priest and was appointed Chaplain of the Melkite Basilian Salvatorian Order.

Chaplain in the US

In 1960 he became Archimandrite of the Melkite parish of Roslindale in Boston, Massachusetts. The parish is part of the Melkite Greek Catholic Eparchy of Newton and is also the seat of the bishop of the Melkite Christians in the United States. In his short tenure as pastor he was instrumental in the planning for the construction of the "Annunciation Melkite Catholic Cathedral" in Roslindale. After the consecration of a bishop in 1962, John Elya, BS, assumed the parish.

Archbishop

The appointment as Archbishop of Homs in Syria took place on December 5, 1961. On April 28, 1962, he was consecrated bishop in Boston by Cardinal Richard Cushing, the Roman Catholic Archbishop of Boston. From 1962 to 1971 Bassoul headed the Melkite Greek Catholic Archeparchy of Homs.

From 21 August 1971 until his death on August 9, 1977 Bassoul became archbishop of Zahle and Forzol in Lebanon. In this office he was succeeded by Augustin Farah. Archbishop Bassoul was from 1962 to 1965 participant in all sessions of the Second Vatican Council. Bassoul was co-consecrator of the Archbishop of Beirut and Byblos, Habib Bacha.

References

External links
 http://www.catholic-hierarchy.org/bishop/bbassoul.html 

1920 births
1977 deaths
Lebanese Melkite Greek Catholics
Melkite Greek Catholic bishops
People from Sidon District